Evgeny Pavlovich Gradovich (born 7 August 1986) is a Russian former professional boxer who competed from 2010 to 2017, and held the IBF featherweight title from 2013 to 2015.

Amateur career
During his amateur career in Russia, Gradovich compiled a record of 127 wins and 23 losses, and made it on the Russian national boxing team.

Professional career

In April 2011, Gradovich beat undefeated Aalan Martínez at the Cosmopolitan Resort in Paradise, Nevada.

IBF featherweight champion
On 1 March 2013, Gradovich scored an upset win over Billy Dib to take his IBF Featherweight Championship. This bout was televised on ESPN2. In June 2013, Gradovich successfully made first title defence by defeating Argentine Mauricio Munoz in a one-sided contest.  On 24 November 2013, he fought again against Dib, on the Manny Pacquiao vs. Brandon Rios undercard. Gradovich dominated the fight, winning by TKO in the 9th round.

Professional boxing record

References

External links

World featherweight boxing champions
1986 births
Living people
Russian male boxers
International Boxing Federation champions
Super-featherweight boxers
People from Beryozovsky District, Khanty-Mansi Autonomous Okrug
Sportspeople from Khanty-Mansi Autonomous Okrug